The Annieopsquotch Mountains are located in the southwestern interior of the Canadian island of Newfoundland, east of Bay St. George. Its name is Mi'kmaq and literally translated means 'terrible rocks'.

Geologically the range is composed of Ordovician ocean floor rock which includes an ophiolite thrust onto the continent during the closure of the Iapetus Ocean. Silurian clastic sedimentary rocks unconformably overly the ophiolite and granite intruded the area during the Devonian. Faulting and tilting of the area continued through the Carboniferous.

References

Mountain ranges of Newfoundland and Labrador